The 2026 NFL Draft will be the 91st annual meeting of National Football League (NFL) franchises to select newly eligible players. The draft is scheduled to be held in a yet to be determined location.

Trades involving draft picks
In the explanations below (PD) indicates trades completed prior to the start of the draft (i.e. Pre–Draft), while (D) denotes trades that took place during the 2026 draft.

2020 Resolution JC-2A picks
Since the 2021 draft, the league, under 2020 Resolution JC-2A passed in November 2020, rewards teams for developing minority candidates for head coach and/or general manager positions. The resolution rewards teams whose minority candidates are hired away for one of those positions by awarding draft picks. These draft picks are at the end of the third round, after standard compensatory picks; if multiple teams qualify, they are awarded by draft order in the first round. These picks are in addition to, and have no impact on, the standard 32 compensatory picks.

References

National Football League Draft
NFL Draft
NFL Draft